William Egerton may refer to:
Sir William Egerton (1649-1691) English politician 
William Egerton (1684–1732), English Army officer and MP
William Egerton, originally William Tatton, (1749–1806), English politician
William Egerton (died 1783) English politician
William Egerton, 1st Baron Egerton (1806–1883)
Bill Egerton (1944–2019) English politician